Khankuk (also Romanized as Khanḵūḵ; also known as Khūnīkūk) is a village in Nimbeluk Rural District, Nimbeluk District, Qaen County, South Khorasan Province, Iran. At the 2006 census, its population was 44, in 13 families.

References 

Populated places in Qaen County